"New Level" is a song by American rapper ASAP Ferg. The song was released on December 18, 2015, as the first single from his second studio album Always Strive and Prosper (2016). It was produced by Honorable C.N.O.T.E. and features Atlanta rapper Future. "New Level" peaked at number 90 on the Billboard Hot 100, becoming his third highest-charting single. The official remix was released on October 20, 2016 with additional verses by rappers A$AP Rocky and Lil Uzi Vert.

Release
The song premiered online on December 17, 2015, and the next day it was released as a single on iTunes. "New Level" was the first single off Always Strive and Prosper, which was released on April 22, 2016.

Music video
A music video for the song premiered on January 19, 2016 via Noisey. It features cameo appearances by Cleveland Browns wide receiver Josh Gordon, Olympic fencer Daryl Homer, and BMX biker Nigel Sylvester.

Charts

Weekly charts

Year-end charts

Certifications

References

External links
 
 

2015 singles
2015 songs
ASAP Ferg songs
Future (rapper) songs
Song recordings produced by Hit-Boy
Songs written by Future (rapper)
Songs written by ASAP Ferg